Wendell White (born 23 November 1964 in Barbados) is a Bermudian cricketer. He is a left-handed batsman and a left-arm medium-fast bowler. He has played one first-class match against the USA and five List A matches for Bermuda, including the 2005 ICC Trophy.

References

External links
Cricket Archive profile
Cricinfo profile

1964 births
Living people
Bermudian cricketers
Barbadian emigrants to Bermuda
Barbadian cricketers